Garden Grove (also known as Garden Grove Estates) is an unincorporated community and census-designated place (CDP) in the U.S. state of Florida, in central Hernando County. The ZIP Code for this community is 34604. As of the 2010 census, Garden Grove had a population of 674.

Geography
Garden Grove is in southern Hernando County and is bordered by Masaryktown to the south, South Brooksville to the north, and Spring Hill to the west. Garden Grove is located along the eastern edge of Hernando County Airport and is dominated by US 41, the main road through the community.

Though they list their address as being Brooksville, Garden Grove is the headquarters of the Southwest Florida Water Management District which is across from The Trails of Rivard Golf and Country Club.

Demographics

Transportation
The main road through Garden Grove is U.S. 41, which runs southwest to northeast from Masaryktown through Brooksville, the Hernando County seat. The CSX Brooksville Subdivision runs along the east side of the road, and contains a spur to the airport, which was revived when US 41 was widened. Two other roads run from west to east; the first is County Road 574 (Spring Hill Drive), which runs along the northern border of Hernando County Airport before terminating at US 41. The other, County Road 572 (Powell Road), runs along the northern edge of Garden Grove and spans from near Weeki Wachee to Spring Lake.

References

Hernando County: Our Story (Bicentennial Edition), by Alfred A. McKethan.
A History of Hernando County: 1840-1976, by Richard J. Stanaback

External links
Garden Grove, Florida (ePodunk.com) 

Census-designated places in Hernando County, Florida
Census-designated places in Florida
Unincorporated communities in Hernando County, Florida
Unincorporated communities in Florida